Mphorosane is a community council located in the Leribe District of Lesotho. Its population in 2006 was 9,392.

Villages
The community of Mphorosane includes the villages of Cangela, Ha 'Maletairi, Ha 'Mikia (Moreneng), Ha Bereng (Ha Ntseli), Ha Khauta, Ha Leqolana, Ha Manamolela, Ha Manti, Ha Mashapha, Ha Masoetsa (Ha Ntšeli), Ha Mofalali, Ha Molotonyane, Ha Mosiuoa, Ha Motebele (Taung), Ha Nkisi, Ha Nteka, Ha Ntseli (London), Ha Rampoea, Ha Selebeli (Ha Ntšeli), Ha Senyenyane, Ha Sephapho, Ha Taunyane, Ha Teko, Holantu, Kolike, Kutung (Vuka-Mosotho), Laitsoka, Lejoemotho, Lekhalong, Litjokofeng (Ha 'Mikia), Makoabating (Ha Ntšeli), Manganeng, Mohlakeng, Mphorosane, Ntširele, Panteng (Ha 'Mikia), Ramaloso, Sekoting, Thaba-Chitja, Tiping and Topa (Vuka-Mosotho).

References

External links
 Google map of community villages

Populated places in Leribe District